Defending champion Roger Federer defeated Fernando González in the final, 7–6(7–2), 6–4, 6–4 to win the men's singles tennis title at the 2007 Australian Open. It was his third Australian Open title and his tenth major title overall. Federer became the first man to win a major without dropping a set since Björn Borg at the 1980 French Open, and the first to do so in a major played on hardcourts. Also, Federer made a record-equaling seventh consecutive major final appearance (streak starting at the 2005 Wimbledon Championships), after Jack Crawford during the 1930s, and became the first man to reach eleven consecutive major semifinals (streak started at the 2004 Wimbledon Championships). González became the first Chilean to reach a major final since Marcelo Ríos in 1998.

This tournament marked the first major main-draw appearance for future US Open champion, three-time major finalist and world No. 3 Marin Čilić; he lost in the first round.

Seeds

Qualifying

Draw

Finals

Top half

Section 1

Section 2

Section 3

Section 4

Bottom half

Section 5

Section 6

Section 7

Section 8

References

External links
 Association of Tennis Professionals (ATP) – 2007 Australian Open Men's Singles draw
 2007 Australian Open – Men's draws and results at the International Tennis Federation

Men's Singles
Australian Open (tennis) by year – Men's singles